The 2013 FIVB Volleyball World Grand Prix was the 21st edition of the annual women's international volleyball tournament played by 20 countries from 2 August to 1 September 2013.

Competing nations

Qualification process

 [a] The top four NORCECA teams and the top from CSV confederation, other than Brazil, at the 2012 Pan-American Cup qualified.

Squads

Calendar
The original list was released December 1, 2012; one day later on December 2 a new list was released to the public.

Preliminary round

Ranking
Japan (finals host) and the top five teams in the preliminary round will advance to the Final round.

|}

All times are local for the host city

First round

Pool A
Venue: Arena Concórdia, Campinas, Brazil

|}

Pool B
Venue: Palácio del Voleibol, Santo Domingo, Dominican Republic

|}

Pool C
Venue: Başkent Volleyball Hall, Ankara, Turkey

|}

Pool D
Venue: Macau Forum, Macau

|}

Pool E
Venue: PalaGeorge, Montichiari, Italy

|}

Second round

Pool F
Venue: Pionir Hall, Belgrade, Serbia

|}

Pool G
Venue: Palacio de Recreación y Deportes, Mayagüez, Puerto Rico

|}

Pool H
Venue: Orlen Arena, Płock, Poland

|}

Pool I
Venue: Hong Kong Coliseum, Hong Kong

|}

Pool J
Venue: DIVS Uralochka, Yekaterinburg, Russia

|}

Third round

Pool K
Venue: Baluan Sholak Palace of Culture and Sports, Almaty, Kazakhstan

|

|}

Pool L
Venue: Indoor Stadium Huamark, Bangkok, Thailand

|}

Pool M
Venue: Sendai Gymnasium, Sendai, Japan

|}

Pool N
Venue: Wuhan Gymnasium, Wuhan, China

|}

Pool O
Venue: Kaohsiung Arena, Kaohsiung, Chinese Taipei

{{Vb res 5|18 Aug|17:30||3–0||25–11|25–9|25–8|||75–28|P2 P3}}
|}

Final round
Final ranking

|}

Pool Final

Venue: Hokkaido Prefectural Sports Center, Sapporo, Japan

|}
All times are local for the host city.

Final standing

AwardsMost Valuable Player  Thaisa MenezesBest Setter  Alisha GlassBest Outside Spikers  Zhu Ting
  Brankica MihajlovicBest Middle Blockers  Thaisa Menezes
  Milena RasicBest Opposite Spiker  Jovana BrakocevicBest Libero'''
  Fabiana de Oliveira

References

External links
Official website

FIVB World Grand Prix
FIVB World Grand Prix
Sports competitions in Sapporo
International volleyball competitions hosted by Japan
2013 in Japanese women's sport
21st century in Sapporo
August 2013 sports events in Asia
September 2013 sports events in Asia